Francisco Gomes de Amorim (13 August 1827 in Póvoa de Varzim, Portugal – 4 November 1891 in Lisbon) was a Portuguese poet and dramatist who was a friend of Almeida Garrett.

References

External links
 
 
 

1827 births
1891 deaths
19th-century Portuguese poets
Portuguese male poets
People from Póvoa de Varzim
19th-century Portuguese dramatists and playwrights
19th-century Portuguese male writers
Portuguese male dramatists and playwrights